Eucalyptus litoralis, commonly known as Anglesea box, is a species of tree that is endemic to a small area in Victoria. It has rough but thin, fibrous bark on the trunk, smooth pale grey bark on the branches, lance-shaped to curved adult leaves, flower buds in groups of seven, white flowers and cup-shaped or barrel-shaped fruit.

Description
The bark on the trunk is rough but thin, fibrous and greyish and on the branches smooth and pale grey. Flowering has been recorded in March and the flowers are white.

Taxonomy and naming
Eucalyptus litoralis was first formally deacribed in 2004 by Kevin Rule from a specimen he collected near Anglesea in 2000. The description was published in the journal Muelleria. The specific epithet (litoralis) is a Latin word meaning "pertaining to the "sea-shore", referring to the distribution of this species.

Distribution and habitat
Anglesea box grows in poor soils on sandstone ridges where it is often exposed to ocean wind. It is found in coastal areas from near Anglesea to Aireys Inlet with an outlier near Lorne.

See also
List of Eucalyptus species

References

Trees of Australia
litoralis
Myrtales of Australia
Flora of Victoria (Australia)
Plants described in 2004